This list is of Major Sites Protected for their Historical and Cultural Value at the National Level in Guangxi Zhuang Autonomous Region, China.

 

 

|}

See also
 Principles for the Conservation of Heritage Sites in China

References

 
Guangxi